Makwanpur District(a part of Bagmati Province, earlier a part of Narayani Zone, is one of the seventy-seven districts of Nepal.

History
During Rana regime, the district was named Chisapani District and the headquarter of the district was situated in Chisapanigadhi. The district renamed as Makwanpur on the name of Makwanpurgadhi and the headquarter moved to Hetauda in 1982.

Geography and climate

Demographics
At the time of the 2011 Nepal census, Makwanpur District had a population of 420,477. Of these, 45.8% spoke Tamang, 41.5% Nepali, 4.1% Newari, 3.9% Chepang, 1.4% Magar, 0.9% Bhojpuri, 0.6% Maithili, 0.5% Rai, 0.2% Gurung, 0.2% Lepcha, 0.2% Majhi, 0.1% Hindi, 0.1% Pahari, 0.1% Tharu, 0.1% Urdu and 0.2% other languages as their first language.

In terms of ethnicity/caste, 48.3% were Tamang, 14.1% Hill Brahmin, 10.5% Chhetri, 6.2% Newar, 4.6% Chepang/Praja, 4.5% Magar, 2.9% Kami, 1.9% Rai, 0.8% Damai/Dholi, 0.8% Majhi, 0.7% Gurung, 0.4% Musalman, 0.4% Thakuri, 0.3% Danuwar, 0.3% Kathabaniyan, 0.3% Pahari, 0.3% Sanyasi/Dasnami, 0.3% Sarki, 0.2% Gharti/Bhujel, 0.2% Tharu, 0.1% Terai Brahmin, 0.1% other Dalit, 0.1% Ghale, 0.1% Hajam/Thakur, 0.1% Kalwar, 0.1% Kanu, 0.1% Limbu, 0.1% Marwadi, 0.1% Sunuwar, 0.1% Teli, 0.1% other Terai, 0.1% Yadav and 0.2% others.

In terms of religion, 48.3% were Hindu, 45.6% Buddhist, 4.8% Christian, 0.7% Prakriti, 0.4% Muslim and 0.2% others.

In terms of literacy, 67.5% could read and write, 2.7% could only read and 29.8% could neither read nor write.

Administration
The district consists of 10 Municipalities, out of which one is a sub-metropolitan city, one is an urban municipality and eight are rural municipalities. These are as follows:
Hetauda Sub-Metropolitan City
Thaha Municipality
Bhimphedi Rural Municipality
Makawanpurgadhi Rural Municipality
Manahari Rural Municipality
Raksirang Rural Municipality
Bakaiya Rural Municipality
Bagmati Rural Municipality
Kailash Rural Municipality
Indrasarowar Rural Municipality

Former Village Development Committees and Municipalities

Agara
Ambhanjyang
Bajrabarahi
Betini
Bhainse
Bharta Pundyadevi
Bhimphedi
Budhichaur
Chhatiwan
Chitlang
Dandakharka
Dhimal
Gogane
Handikhola
Hetauda (Sub metropolitan city)
Hurnamadi
Ipa Panchakanya
Kalikatar
Kankada
Khairang
Kogate
Kulekhani
Makwanpurgadhi
Manahari
Manthali
Markhu
Marta Punchedevi
Namtar
Nibuwatar
Fakhel
Phaparbari
Raigaun
Raksirang
Sarikhet Palase
Shikharpur
Sripur Chhatiwan
Sisneri Mahadevsthan
Sukaura
Thaha Municipality
Thingan
Tistung Deurali

Notable people 
 Tilak Bahadur Negi Lamaतिलक बहादुर नेगी - Nepalese politician, first minister of Makwanpur District and nepalese Tamang people/Communities in June 16 1981 (२०३८ असार २ गते).
 Rupchandra Bista - Nepalese politician
 Kamal Thapa - Nepalese politician
 Ganesh Thapa - ex. president of the All Nepal Football Association 
 Kabiraj Negi Lama - Nepalese National Para Taekwondo Team Coach and 2020 Summer Paralympics Coach
 Ananta Prasad Paudel - Nepalese politician
 Ganesh Lal Shrestha - Nepalese poet, musician and social worker
 Bal Krishna Pokharel - Nepalese writer, linguist, historian, and literary critic
 Kedar Ghimire - Nepalese comedian, actor, scriptwriter, and film producer
 Ajeya Sumargi - chairman of the Muktishree group of companies
 Anjan Bista - Nepali footballer
 Bikash Bista -  Nepalese Economist and Statistician, and the former Director General of Central Bureau of Statistics of Nepal
 Birodh Khatiwada - Nepalese politician
 Indra Bahdur Baniya - Nepalese politician
 Girija Prasad Adhikari
 Prabesh Rijal
 Dipak Bahadur Singh
 Rajan Mainali
 Shrinkhala Khatiwada - Nepalese model and Miss Nepal World 2018
 Sunil Bal - Nepalese footballer 
 Shrijana Ghising - Nepalese Para Taekwondo practitioner

References

 

 
Districts of Nepal established during Rana regime or before
Districts of Bagmati Province